Two ships of the United States Navy have been named USS Bataan, after the Bataan Peninsula, the scene of the Battle of Bataan in 1942 in the Philippines.

 , was a light aircraft carrier that served in both World War II and the Korean War.
 , is an amphibious assault ship commissioned in 1997 and currently on active service.

See also
  - Australian destroyer named to commemorate the same action

Sources

United States Navy ship names